Taranis rhytismeis is a species of sea snail, a marine gastropod mollusk in the family Raphitomidae.

Description
The length of the shell attains 3 mm, its diameter 1.5 mm.

The wrinkled sculpture and strong median peripheral angulation distinguish this small white species. Only a specimen
or two have been found in 1910.

Distribution
This marine species occurs in the Gulf of Oman.

References

External links
 
  J.C. Melvill (1910) Descriptions of Twenty-nine Species of Marine Mollusca from the Persian Gulf, Gulf of Oman, and North  Arabian Sea; The Annals and magazine of natural history; zoology, botany, and geology being a continuation of the Annals combined with Loudon and Charlesworth's Magazine of Natural History; 8th ser. vol. VI
 J.C.Melvill (1917), A revision of the Turridae (Pleurotomidae) occurring in the Persian Gulf, Gulf of Oman and North Arabian Sea, as evidenced mostly through the results of dredgings carried out by Mr. F. W. Townsend, 1893-1914; Proceedings of the Malacological Society of London. vol. 12 (1917)

rhytismeis
Gastropods described in 1910